XEZH-AM is a radio station on 1260 kHz in Salamanca, Guanajuato.

History
XEZH came to air on May 15, 1966 after receiving its concession on October 17, 1964.

References

Radio stations in Guanajuato